Ventricularia is a genus of flowering plants from the orchid family, Orchidaceae. There are two known species, native to Southeast Asia.

Ventricularia borneensis J.J.Wood - Sabah, Sarawak
Ventricularia tenuicaulis (Hook.f.) Garay - Thailand, Peninsular Malaysia

See also 
 List of Orchidaceae genera

References

External links 

Vandeae genera
Aeridinae
Orchids of Asia
Flora of Indo-China